Vernon Chapman (9 May 1921 – 6 June 2006) was an English footballer who played in the Football League as a winger for Leicester City and Leyton Orient. He went on to play for and then manage Tamworth, initially as player-manager.

Chapman died on 6 June 2006 in Leicester, England at the age of 85.

Managerial Statistics

References

1921 births
2006 deaths
English footballers
Association football wingers
Bath City F.C. players
Leicester City F.C. players
Leyton Orient F.C. players
Tamworth F.C. players
English Football League players
English football managers
Tamworth F.C. managers